Brown sugar is unrefined or partially refined soft sugar.

Brown Sugar may also refer to:

Arts, entertainment, and media

Films
 Brown Sugar (1922 film), a 1922 British silent film directed by Fred Paul
 Brown Sugar (1931 film), a 1931 British romantic drama starring Constance Carpenter
 Brown Sugar (2002 film), a 2002 American romantic drama starring Taye Diggs

Music

Artists
 Clydie King (1943–2019), also known as Brown Sugar, American singer, member of the vocal group The Raelettes
 Brown Sugar (group), a British female vocal reggae group formed in 1976

Albums
 Brown Sugar (D'Angelo album)
 Brown Sugar (Freddie Roach album) a 1964 album by jazz organist Freddie Roach
 Brown Sugar (soundtrack), the soundtrack to the 2002 film

Songs
"Brown Sugar" (D'Angelo song)
 "Brown Sugar" (Rolling Stones song), by the Rolling Stones
"Brown Sugar", a song by John Mayall from his 1967 album The Blues Alone  
 "Brown Sugar", song by ZZ Top from ZZ Top's First Album
 "Brown Sugar", a song by Instruktsiya po Vyzhivaniyu (1986)

Other uses
 Brown Sugar, crayon color of Crayola Heads 'n Tails
 Brown sugar, a grade of heroin

See also 
 Bubbling Brown Sugar
 Sweet Brown Sugar (disambiguation)